Asystel Volley was an Italian women's volleyball club based in Novara. It played in the Serie A1 from its creation in 2003 until its dissolution in 2012.

Previous names
Due to sponsorship, the club have competed under the following names:
 Asystel Novara (2003–2004)
 Sant'Orsola Asystel Novara (2004–2007)
 Asystel Volley Novara (2007–2012)

History
The club was founded in 2003, when Serie A1 club AGIL Volley decided to focus on youth teams. Asystel who was AGIL's main sponsor at the time, established a professional club keeping AGIL Serie A1 licence, which meant the new club started its existence playing in the highest Italian league (Serie A1).

Apart from the Serie A1 participation, the club also played in the Italian Cup, Italian Supercup, Women's CEV Cup and CEV Women's Champions League. It had some success and won the Italian Cup in 2003–04, the Italian Supercup in 2003 and 2005, the CEV Top Teams Cup in 2005–06 and the CEV Cup in 2008–09.

In 2012 it merged with Gruppo Sportivo Oratorio Villa Cortese, moving all its volleyball activities to the newly formed .

Notable players

 Anja Spasojević
 Ivana Nešović
 Małgorzata Glinka
 Cristina Pîrv
 Sanja Malagurski
 Stefana Veljković
 Ogonna Nnamani
 Feng Kun

Former coaches
 Giovanni Caprara

Honours

National competitions
  Coppa Italia: 1
2003–04

  Italian Super Cup: 2
2003, 2005

International competitions
  Top Teams Cup / CEV Cup: 2
2005–06, 2008–09

References

Italian women's volleyball clubs
Volleyball clubs established in 2003
2003 establishments in Italy
Defunct sports teams in Italy
Sports clubs disestablished in 2012
2012 disestablishments in Italy
Sport in Novara
Serie A1 (women's volleyball) clubs